is a Japanese rugby union player who played as a prop or hooker. He's currently playing for Coca-Cola Red Sparks in Japan's domestic Top League. He was named in the Japan squad for the 2007 Rugby World Cup, but withdrew from the tournament due to injury. He made a further 10 appearances for Japan in his career, scoring three tries.

References

External links
itsrugby.co.uk profile

1981 births
Living people
Japanese rugby union players
Rugby union props
Rugby union hookers
Saitama Wild Knights players
Yokohama Canon Eagles players
Coca-Cola Red Sparks players
Sportspeople from Okayama
Japan international rugby union players